Art Building may refer to:

Art Building (Rocky Ford, Colorado)
Art Building (Willamette University), Salem, Oregon
Art Building and Annex, Portland State University, Oregon
Art Building (University of Texas at Austin)